HMS Bacchante was a  armoured cruiser built for the Royal Navy around 1900. Upon completion she was assigned to the Mediterranean Fleet as flagship of the fleet's cruiser squadron. She was reduced to reserve upon her return home in 1905 before returning to the Mediterranean in 1906. Six years later she returned home and was again placed in reserve. Recommissioned at the start of World War I, Bacchante became flagship of the 7th Cruiser Squadron. She was present at the Battle of Heligoland Bight a few weeks after the war began, but saw no combat.

She was transferred to convoy escort duties in the Bay of Biscay in late 1914 before being sent to Egypt in early 1915. Bacchante was then assigned to support Anzac troops during the Gallipoli Campaign by providing naval gunfire. She covered the landing at Anzac Cove in April as well as several subsequent operations. Returning home in late 1916, she became the flagship of the 9th Cruiser Squadron on convoy escort duties off the African coast in mid-1917. Bacchante remained there for the rest of the war and was reduced to reserve in 1919 before being sold for scrap in 1920.

Design and description
Bacchante was designed to displace . The engines were powered by 30 Belleville boilers. On their sea trials all of the Cressy-class cruisers, except the lead ship, exceeded their designed speed.

Her main armament consisted of two breech-loading (BL)  Mk X guns in single gun turrets, one each fore and aft of the superstructure. Her secondary armament of twelve BL 6-inch Mk VII guns was arranged in casemates amidships. Eight of these were mounted on the main deck and were only usable in calm weather. A dozen quick-firing (QF) 12-pounder 12-cwt guns were fitted for defence against torpedo boats, eight on casemates on the upper deck and four in the superstructure. The ship also carried three 3-pounder Hotchkiss guns and two submerged 18-inch torpedo tubes.

The armour of the gun turrets and their barbettes was 6 inches thick while the casemate armour was 5 inches thick.

Construction and service
Bacchante, named after the female devotees of the Greek god Bacchus, was laid down by John Brown & Company at their shipyard in Clydebank on 15 February 1899 and launched on 21 February 1901. She arrived at Chatham Dockyard the following October, to be equipped and prepared for her steam and gunnery trials  and was completed in November 1902. Upon completion, she was commissioned by Captain Frederic Edward Errington Brock on 25 November 1902 and assigned to the Mediterranean Fleet as flagship of its cruiser squadron, replacing . On arrival in the Mediterranean, Brock changed places on 20 December with Captain Christopher Cradock, who had until then been in command of Andromeda. Bacchante remained in the Mediterranean under Cradock's command until 1905 when she returned home and was placed in reserve. She returned there in 1906 for service with the 3rd and later the 6th Cruiser Squadrons, and in January 1907 her command was given to William Ruck-Keene, who held it until October 1910.

The Census 1911 reveals her in the Mediterranean under the Flag of Rear Admiral Douglas Gamble and captained (Flag Captain) by Reginald Tyrwhitt.  Gamble's Flag Lieutenant was Bertram Ramsay.

Upon returning home in 1912, the ship was assigned to the reserve Third Fleet.

At the outbreak of the war in August 1914, Bacchante became the flagship of the 7th Cruiser Squadron, tasked with patrolling the Broad Fourteens of the North Sea in support of a force of destroyers and submarines based at Harwich which protected the eastern end of the English Channel from German warships attempting to attack the supply route between England and France. During the Battle of Heligoland Bight on 28 August, the ship was flagship of Rear Admiral Henry Campbell commanding Cruiser Force 'C', in reserve off the Dutch coast, and saw no action. After the sinking of Bacchantes three sister ships while patrolling the Broad Fourteens on 22 September, she, and her sister , were transferred to the 12th Cruiser Squadron to escort ships between England and Gibraltar in early October.

Bacchante and Euryalus were transferred to Egypt in late January 1915 to reinforce the defences of the Suez Canal although the Turkish raid on the Suez Canal had already been repulsed by the time that they arrived in February. By this time the preliminary bombardments of the Turkish defences of the Dardanelles had already occurred and the sisters were transferred north in March as the Turks east of the Canal proved to be reasonably quiet.

During the landing at Anzac Cove during the Battle of Gallipoli on 25 April, Bacchante suppressed Turkish artillery positions at Gaba Tepe after touching her bow the beach for a better position from which to engage the guns. She provided fire support for forces near Anzac Cove for the next several months, particularly during the Third attack on Anzac Cove on 19 May when she, together with three pre-dreadnought battleships, effectively suppressed the Turkish artillery assigned to support the attack. On 28 May Bacchante and the destroyer  destroyed enemy shipping in Bodrum harbour. Three months later the cruiser bombarded Turkish troops during the Battle of Lone Pine on 6 August and Battle of Chunuk Bair 7–9 August. She was not present when the Allies began to evacuate Gallipoli in December, but her captain, Algernon Boyle, commanded the evacuation at Anzac Cove.

She remained in the Mediterranean until late 1916 when she returned home. She was damaged in a collision with the armoured cruiser  in the Irish Sea in February 1917. After repairs she became flagship of the 9th Cruiser Squadron at Sierra Leone from April 1917 to November 1918. Bacchante was paid off at Chatham in April 1919 and sold for scrap on 1 July 1920.

Notes

Footnotes

Bibliography 
 
 
 
 
 
 
 
 
 Transcription of ship's logbooks June 1917 to April 1919

External links

HMS Bacchante (Clydebuilt Ships Database)

 

Cressy-class cruisers
Ships built on the River Clyde
World War I cruisers of the United Kingdom
1901 ships